The Jacobean debate on the Union took place in the early years of the reign of James I of England, who came to the English throne in 1603 as James VI of Scotland, and was interested in uniting his Kingdoms of England (including Wales) and Scotland. With one monarch on the two thrones there was de facto a "regnal union", but since James was very widely accepted in England, the debate was not on that plane. A political union was more controversial and is often referred to as a "statutory union", underlining the fact that the legal systems and institutions involved were different, and had had distinct historical paths. That wider union did not in fact come about in the 17th century (apart from the arrangements of the 1650s under the Commonwealth), but at the time of the Union of England and Scotland in 1707, arguments from the earlier period were again put into circulation.

While the "Union of the Crowns" represented by James on his accession in England was essentially undisputed, the further political union, thought of as "Union of the Kingdoms" or "statutory union", was resisted. Legislation was produced, north and south of the border by costive parliamentary debate from 1604 to 1607, but it was limited in scope, mainly removing hostile laws. While jurists and religious figures supported a deeper union, the envisaged process stalled, and incompatibilities of the English and Scottish societies became more apparent.

Background
The union of England and Scotland was anticipated by the Treaty of Greenwich of 1543, under which Mary, Queen of Scots was to marry the future Edward VI of England. This dynastic union did not take place, despite The Rough Wooing; but it produced a pro-union literature, notably in works written by the Scots John Elder and James Henrisoun, and the Englishmen William Patten and Protector Somerset. The idea was revived in the early years of the reign of Elizabeth I of England, with the project of her marriage to James Hamilton, 3rd Earl of Arran, heir presumptive to the Scottish crown.

The claim of James VI to the English throne was also bound up with the Tudor dynasty, coming (despite provisions in the will of Henry VIII) through his great-grandmothers Margaret Tudor and Mary Tudor. He had two new official signet rings made, combining the arms of England and Scotland. A Latin slogan used on his coins, Henricus rosas regna Jacobus, pointed up a comparison with Henry VII: it implied that Henry's role in uniting the Roses (see Tudor rose) had been followed by James's in uniting the kingdoms.

Underlying issues
The Scots were traditionally allied to France (the "Auld Alliance"), and had often been at war with England. Christophe de Harlay, comte de Beaumont, French ambassador in England, saw the proposed closer union as a negative in terms of France's interests; and more so when James brought the Anglo-Spanish War to an end in 1604. He cultivated good relations with a small group of prominent Scottish nobles who were committed to the French alliance. It had brought to Scotland some commercial advantages, and privileges for naturalisation. Henry Savile and others analysed the union in terms of its security threat.

The political systems of the two countries, despite some superficial similarities of structure, were in fact rather different. The councils and parliaments functioned in different ways, and the Scottish system had been in transition for two decades. Scotland had a reputation for prolonged internal instability, a point brought up in the English parliament by the xenophobic Christopher Pigott in 1607.

A full commercial and customs union was seen as against English interests; and Savile mentioned that Scotland would retain trading advantages with France. The Scottish economy was less well developed, its merchant ships smaller, and the existing trade between the two countries was not very extensive. Free trade, it was argued, would mostly benefit the Scots.

In religious terms, it was clear that full union would cement a Protestant alliance. This was a powerful argument in its favour, for many. But the churches of England and Scotland were not identical, in organisation and ceremony. There was a tension noticed at the time, between declaring the points of difference adiaphora, and advocating for religious uniformity. In this context, Robert Pont pointed up the use of the term Puritan as pejorative in England.

Supporters
Supporters were those who wanted to see a union that went further than the union of the two crowns, or "regnal union", that had been realised in the person of King James. They consisted of various groups: the "court party" in politics, for whom Francis Bacon was the leading spokesman, with allied courtiers; publicists; jurists; and interpreters of prophetic and apocalyptic writings.

Court advocates
Francis Bacon consistently advocated a fuller union of the kingdoms, as a parliamentarian and also as a writer. He took it that the Anglo-Scottish union offered a chance for "greatness" of the combined monarchy.

Among courtiers, James Colville, 1st Lord Colville of Culross was an important unionist supporter. Calvin's case, the leading legal test of the status of citizenship after the 1603 union of the crowns, was at least notionally concerned with the legal rights of Colville's young grandson James.

Publicists
Most of the pamphlet literature on the proposed union was produced in the period May to October 1604. Those advocating in print in favour of the union in 1604 included William Cornwallis (The Miraculous and Happy Union between England and Scotland), and John Gordon in his Enotikon Or a Sermon of the Vnion of Great Brittannie. John Thornborough, bishop of Bristol, published A Discourse plainly proving the evident Utility and urgent Necessity of the desired happy Union of England and Scotland (1604); the House of Commons believed the work reflected badly on their proceedings, and reprimanded him. Thornborough then followed with a longer work, Joiefull and Blessed Reuniting. Edward Forsett's A Comparative Discourse of the Bodies Natural and Politique (1606), on the theory of the King's Two Bodies, also advocated for the union.

Jurists
The English civilian John Cowell wrote Institutiones juris Anglicani (1605), on the perceived obstacle to full union, the common law. He proposed an integration of English and Scottish law on the basis of greater conformity of the common law to civil law. The legal writings of Sir Thomas Craig, in Jus feudale and other works, addressed related questions, but from a Scottish perspective, and with emphasis on the common origins of the Scottish and English legal systems in feudal law. Craig has been seen as an advocate of union; but his works are more complex than that assessment would suggest, and had a lasting influence on jurists both sides of the border. Craig adopted the same line as John Mair had done in the early 16th century, in favour of a "union of equals". He particularly detested the "Description of Britain" of William Harrison, prefaced to the Holinshed's Chronicles, which made a claim of English lordship, and slurred the ancient Scots.

The Bristol lawyer George Saltern invoked ideas on the ancient constitution, in his Of the Ancient Lawes of Great Britaine, claiming that the old British laws went back to King Lucius. Scottish lawyer John Russell (c.1550–1612) wrote and circulated a long manuscript work Treatise of the Happie and Blissed Unioun.

Prophetic interpreters
The union of the crowns fed into a tradition of prophetic interpretation of political events, both secular (going back to the Prophetiae Merlini) and biblical. The Whole Prophesie of Scotland of 1603 treated Merlin's prophecies as authoritative. James Maxwell, a student of prophecy who put it to political use in the reign of King James, distinguished between the Welsh and "Caledonian" Merlins. Union was defended in particular by John Lewis of Llynwene, in a multi-book The History of Great Britain, not published until the 18th century when Hugh Thomas edited it from a manuscript, but circulated with the King's approval; it drew on Richard White of Basingstoke as well as traditional sources.

Sir William Alexander, writing in praise of King James, invoked the prophetic tradition and dated it to 300 years before the King's birth (the mid-13th century). That timing tied it to the Scottish writer, Thomas the Rhymer. The use of "Great Britain" as a title of the kingdom as united by James was considered to reference Brutus of Troy, of the Anglo-Welsh traditional foundation myth. A mythological consonance was seen by some at the time between what were different traditions. Alexander looked ahead, to Henry Frederick, Prince of Wales and a crusading, imperial Britain. On the other hand, the "British history" was then already under strong attack, for example by William Camden. The visionary views of Alexander, Gordon and Maxwell were unrepresentative of Scottish opinion in general, which was more in tune with Craig.

In other ways the prophetic interpretation ran into incompatibilities, which were quite marked in apocalyptic thinking. In particular John Foxe's apocalyptic thought clashed seriously with that of John Napier. The Presbyterians of the Church of Scotland could accept the value of a unified Protestant kingdom but not the idea of the privilege of the Church of England as elected, which was Foxe's influential claim.

Scottish criticism of Foxe came to play a role in breaking down the orthodoxy in England on apocalyptic thought. Thomas Brightman began a process of decoupling "imperial" and "apocalyptic" themes of the end times, in the Anglican context where Foxe had linked them strongly.

Commissions and parliamentary processes

Formally the business of moving to a closer union was given to a commission; its English membership included Sir George Carew the diplomat, and Sir Henry Hobart the lawyer. Comprising a large group of 39 from the English side, it signed a prospective treaty on 6 December 1604. Substantive work on the border laws was done in subcommittee of the union commission from late 1604, by English and Scottish lawyers: Francis Bacon, John Bennett, Daniel Dunne, Sir John Herbert, Sir Thomas Hesketh, Sir Henry Hobart (Hubbard) and Lawrence Tanfield, acting with Thomas Craig, Sir Thomas Hamilton, John Shairp of Houston and John Skene.

From this point onwards the measure ran into parliamentary opposition, manifested in the House of Commons. It was orchestrated by Henry Wriothesley, 3rd Earl of Southampton through Sir Maurice Berkeley, Sir Herbert Croft, Sir Henry Neville, and Sir Edwin Sandys.

Particularly the target of parliamentary tactics by Sandys, the bill to ratify the proposed treaty was bogged down for over two years, and in mid-1607 the Parliament of England passed only a much mutilated form, which abolished laws hostile to Scotland.

North of the border, the Scottish parliament set up its own commission in July 1604, a group of 30 of whom any 20 could act. It included Alexander Livingstone, 1st Earl of Linlithgow, and a group from it was at court (Whitehall Palace in the London area) from October to December that year. The parliament's proceedings on the union issue then showed unaccustomed independence of the Scottish crown. A matching act of 1607 removed laws hostile to England; it also addressed justice in the border area.

The proposed closer union was effectively prevented by opposition in the House of Commons in 1607. Leading opponents of union were Thomas Wentworth and Henry Yelverton. A notably disingenuous tactic of Sandys, to argue that only a "perfect" union should be accepted, was decisive in this session by its blocking of incremental progress.

The stalling of union in the English legislature did not immediately put an end to discussions on legal union. King James pursued the matter further through George Home, 1st Earl of Dunbar, and then in discussions with Alexander Seton, 1st Earl of Dunfermline in 1608. The Scots resisted changes to their legal system. Bacon, who was not averse to reform of English law on civil law principles, wrote for the king Preparation Toward the Union of the Laws of England and Scotland (later published). English and Scottish representatives met again. Little came of these moves.

Britain

Britain as a toponym had by now largely replaced Albion in literary use. But its association with the "Brutus myth" could also make it seem loaded. Sandys protested in Parliament against the royal title change, to "King of Great Britain". An argument brought up was on precedence: a "new" kingdom of Britain would lose its position among (European) kingdoms.

Anthony Weldon, with animus against James, later mocked "Britain" as a barbarous Scottish invention. The long descriptive poem Poly-Olbion by Michael Drayton was belated in terms of its contribution to the union debate, but is now seen as engaging in British and Saxon history at a local level. The plantation of Ulster was recognised at the time as conforming to the imperial British model.

Imperial title

Sir William Maurice proposed in the Commons in 1604, and again in 1606, that James should adopt the title "Emperor of Great Britain", an unpopular idea.

James was hailed by some as successor to Constantine, Roman Emperor identified as "British". The imperial idea had been exploited by Elizabeth I, and was available to James, as in the apocalyptic concept of Last Roman Emperor; but John Foxe equated the Christian Emperor with Constantine the Great. James's own project has been called an "imperial vision of godly monarchy".

See also
Union of England and Scotland Act 1603
List of Jacobean union tracts

References
Bruce Galloway, The Union of England and Scotland 1603–1608 (1986), John Donald Publishers Ltd, Edinburgh

Notes

James VI and I
Unionism in the United Kingdom